The Vuosnayoki is a river in the south of the Kola Peninsula in Murmansk Oblast, Russia. The river flows into the Lake Nivayarvi, which is drained by the Kutsayoki.

References

Rivers of Murmansk Oblast